The 2010 Division 1 season was the 45th of the competition of the first-tier football in Senegal and the third professional season.  The tournament was organized by the Senegalese Football Federation.  The season began earlier on 20 February and finished on 7 August.  It was the second season labelled as a "League" ("Ligue" in French).  ASC Diaraf won their eleventh and recent title, and a year later would compete in the 2011 CAF Champions League.  Touré Kunda who won the 2010 Senegalese Cup participated in the 2011 CAF Confederation Cup. ASC Niarry Tally (2nd place) and ASC HLM (2nd place of Group A) participated in the West African Cup for the last time.

The season would feature 18 clubs and as the final season would use the group and playoff system, the winner would be decided again by points in the following season.  It had a total of 128 matches (84 each group) and the playoff system, and two final matches that decided the winner with the most goals.  The season scored a total of 257 goals, 121 in Group A and 131 in Group B for a total of 252 in the regular season and 5 in the finals.  The highest seasonal by club was Casa Sport of Group B, the lowest was Saloum of the same group.

ASC Linguère again was the defending team of the title.

Participating clubs

 Renaissance sportive de Yoff
 ASC Linguère
 ASC Port Autonome
 AS Douanes
 ASC Jeanne d'Arc
 ASC Saloum
 US Gorée
 Casa Sport
 ASC Yakaar

 Compagnie sucrière sénégalaise (Senegalese Sugar Company)
 ASC HLM
 ASC Diaraf
 Dakar Université Club
 AS Pikine
 NGB ASC Niarry Tally
 ASEC Ndiambour
 Stade de Mbour
 US Ouakam
 Guédiawaye FC

Overview
The league was contested by 18 teams and two groups, each group contained nine clubs and a final match.

League standings

Group A

Group B

Final phase

Top scorers

References

Senegal
2009–10 in Senegalese football
Senegal Premier League seasons